Kieran Richard Ferguson Parselle (born 1 December 1996) is an English semi professional footballer who currently plays as a defender for Bath City.

Career
Parselle is a product of the Newport County academy and he signed his first professional contract in May 2015.

He made his senior debut for Newport aged 18 in the starting line up for the Football League Cup first round match versus Wolverhampton Wanderers at Molineux on 11 August 2015. Wolves won the game 2–1 but Parselle was named man of the match for an assured display. He made his Football League debut for Newport on 15 August 2015 in a 2–2 draw versus Stevenage.

In September 2015 Parselle was named in the top 11 under 21 footballers to look out for in the FourFourTwo magazine.

In August 2016, Parselle joined Salisbury on loan until 31 January 2017. On 9 May 2017, Parselle was released by Newport at the end of the 2016–17 season.

Gloucester City
In June 2017 Parselle signed for National League South club  Gloucester City.

Chippenham Town
In June 2018 Parselle signed for National League South club Chippenham Town and in July 2019 Parselle was named club captain. In June 2022 Parselle was named in the Vanarama and Non League paper National League South 2021-22 teams of the season.

Bath City
On 13 June 2022, Parselle joined Bath City.

Career statistics

References

External links

1996 births
Living people
People from Portishead, Somerset
English footballers
Association football defenders
Newport County A.F.C. players
Salisbury F.C. players
Gloucester City A.F.C. players
Chippenham Town F.C. players
Bath City F.C. players
English Football League players
Southern Football League players
National League (English football) players